Mallada signatus, commonly known as the green lacewing is a species of insect described by  in 1851.

It is one of the species most commonly found in southern Australia.

They closely resemble Plesiochyrsa ramburi, however, the late instar larva and adults of Mallada signatus are smaller, with minimal dark markings on the head of the adults.

They can be negatively effected by feeding on prey which has been in contact with neem oil.

References

External links
Work in which Schneider described the species

Chrysopidae
Insects of Australia
Insects described in 1851